Kamiesberg Local Municipality is in South Africa.

Population
In 2007 an estimated 12,117 persons lived in Kamiesberg; however, this estimate is very rough.  The majority of Kamiesberg's people are coloured (mixed race).

Kharkams village represents, in many ways, the typical village in Kamiesberg: the average education level is 6.7 years; electricity reached the village in 1999; water is available in nearly every house; villagers have access to health care once a week.

Sheep and goats are kept on villager-owned land between Kamiesberg's eleven villages.

Topography and climate
Kamiesberg municipality spans three topographic zones. The area stretches from the sandy coastal lowlands (Sandveld) to the mountainous central Kamiesberg escarpment (Hardveld), and to the eastern plateau of Bushmanland. There are no perennial rivers in the area. Water is obtained from subterranean sources. Some of the water is pumped up by windmills, but most of the water to the communal areas is from natural springs. Many of these springs are semi-perennial, and the salt content of the water can vary from year to year, causing problems. Rainfall has on average decreased from 1970 to 1994.

Soils and vegetation
Four main types of vegetation are found in the area: Mountains Renosterveld, Succulent Karoo, False Succulent Karoo and Namaqualand Broken Veldt. However, overall plant life is in a deteriorating state, and non-edible, undesirable and poisonous vegetation is taking over.

Sources of household income in Kamiesberg
A survey (2003) of three communal villages in Kamiesberg (only 74 saailande owners) showed the following sources of household income:  wage labour (49%), government transfers (28%), small business (11%), remittances (6%), livestock income (3%) and farm income (3%).

Communal institutions
Like every other municipality in Namaqualand, Kamiesberg is governed by formal institutions. The most important formal institutions are: Kamiesberg Municipality located in Garies, the Common Management Committee (Meentcommetee), the Old Local Council and Transitional Local Councils (TLCs).

Main places
The 2011 census divided the municipality into the following main places:

Politics 

The municipal council consists of eleven members elected by mixed-member proportional representation. Six councillors are elected by first-past-the-post voting in six wards, while the remaining five are chosen from party lists so that the total number of party representatives is proportional to the number of votes received. In the election of 1 November 2021 the African National Congress (ANC) won a majority of six seats on the council.
The following table shows the results of the election.

References

External links
 Official website

Local municipalities of the Namakwa District Municipality